Incognito tournée was the second concert tour organized to support her eighth French-language and eighth studio album Incognito (1987). Dion gave 75 shows in Quebec.

History
Céline Dion toured Quebec only. The Incognito tournée started on 11 January 1988 at the Theatre du Cuivre, Rouyn-Noranda. Dion gave 7 concerts in the northern region of Quebec and 2 in Laval.

Dion gave a series of 42 consecutive shows at the Saint-Denis Theatre in Montreal. She performed there for a month starting on 10 February 1988, and later between 12–17 April 1988, 14–19 June 1988, 21–24 September 1988 and 14–18 December 1988.

Dion performed mainly tracks from Incognito, but also a medley of songs from the musical Starmania, "Ton visage" (Jean-Pierre Ferland's cover) and she did imitations of Michael Jackson, Mireille Mathieu, Ginette Reno and Diane Dufresne. During that tour she lost her voice for the first time.

On 2 May 1989, year after winning Eurovision Song Contest with "Ne partez pas sans moi," Dion gave her first concert in Switzerland. She performed in Theatre de Baulieu in Lausanne.

In reference to this tour Celine has said "the memories that first come to mind when I think of the Incognito tour are filled with fits of laughter. From the beginning, in Abitibi, just like the preceding tour, we all knew that we had a good product. And an audience that had been conquered in advance."

Set list
"That's What Friends Are For"
"Comme un cœur froid"
"Carmen "L'amour est enfant de bohême""
"Ton Visage"
"Love by Another Name"
Medley Starmania:
"Quand on arrive en ville"
"Les uns contre les autres"
"Le monde est stone"
"Naziland, ce soir on danse"
"Incognito"
"Délivre-moi"
"Lolita (trop jeune pour aimer)"
"D'abord, c'est quoi l'amour?"
"Ne partez pas sans moi"

Tour dates

Personnel

Production
 Management: René Angélil, Feeling Productions Inc.
 Tour Manager: Suzanne Gingue
 Sound Technician: Denis Savage
 Stage Sound: Daniel Baron

Band
 Keyboards, Vocals, Guitars: Claude "Mégo" Lemay
 Drums: Marc Alie
 Bass, Vocals: Breen LeBoeuf
 Guitars: Pierre Gauthier
 Keyboards: Paul Morin
 Saxophones: Martin Daviault
 Backing Vocals: Ghislaine Dion

References

Celine Dion concert tours
1988 concert tours